Dmitry Volkov may refer to:

 Dmitry Volkov (statesman) (1718–1785), Russian senator (1768–1782), governor of Saint Petersburg Governorate 1779–1780
 Dmitry Volkov (swimmer) (born 1966), swimmer from Russia
 Dmitry Volkov (volleyball) (born 1995), Russian volleyball player
 Dmitry Borisovich Volkov (born 1976), entrepreneur, investor, philosopher, member of the contemporary art scene